The AMD Athlon X2 processor family consists of processors based on both the Athlon 64 X2 and the Phenom processor families. The original Athlon X2 processors were low-power Athlon 64 X2 Brisbane processors, while newer processors released in Q2 2008 are based on the K10 Kuma processor.

Features overview

K8-based

"Brisbane" (G1 & G2, 65 nm)

Energy-efficient 'BE' series
 All models support: MMX, SSE, SSE2, SSE3, Enhanced 3DNow!, NX bit, AMD64, Cool'n'Quiet, AMD-V

Energy-efficient 'e' series
 All models support: MMX, SSE, SSE2, SSE3, Enhanced 3DNow!, NX bit, AMD64, Cool'n'Quiet, AMD-V

Business-class 'B' series
 All models support: MMX, SSE, SSE2, SSE3, Enhanced 3DNow!, NX bit, AMD64, Cool'n'Quiet, AMD-V

K10-based

"Kuma" (B3, 65 nm)
 Chip harvests from Agena with two cores disabled
 All models support: MMX, SSE, SSE2, SSE3, SSE4a, ABM, Enhanced 3DNow!, NX bit, AMD64, Cool'n'Quiet, AMD-V
Memory support: DDR2 SDRAM up to PC2-8500

"Regor/Deneb" (C2, 45 nm)
 Some 5000 series processors are chip harvests from Propus or Deneb; All 5200 series chips are harvests, each has two cores disabled
 All models support: MMX, SSE, SSE2, SSE3, SSE4a, ABM, Enhanced 3DNow!, NX bit, AMD64, Cool'n'Quiet, AMD-V

Notes

See also
 Athlon X2
 AMD Phenom
 List of AMD Athlon 64 processors
 List of AMD Phenom processors

References

External links
 AMD Revised Desktop Model Number Structure, VR-Zone, 9 October 2007
 AMD Adds Kuma & Lima To Athlon Brand , VR-Zone, 10 October 2007
 AMD Delivers Business-Ready Desktop Offerings to Solution Providers with AMD Business Class Initiative AMD, 28 April 2008

Athlon X2
AMD Athlon X2